Pervomaysky District is an administrative and municipal district (raion), one of the seventeen in Yaroslavl Oblast, Russia. It is located in the north of the oblast. Its administrative center is the urban locality (a work settlement) of Prechistoye. Population: 11,012 (2010 Census);  The population of Prechistoye accounts for 44.0% of the district's total population.

References

Notes

Sources

Districts of Yaroslavl Oblast